Robert Batty may refer to:
Robert Batty (artist) (1789–1848), English army officer and artist
Robert Batty (physician) (1763–1849), his father, English physician

See also
Robert Battey (1828–1895), American surgeon